Oscar Lawner (born 13 February 2001) is a professional Swedish ice hockey player. Lawner currently plays for Färjestad BK in the Swedish Hockey League. His youth team was Kils AIK.

Awards and honours

References

External links

2001 births
Living people
BIK Karlskoga players
Färjestad BK players
Sportspeople from Karlstad
Swedish ice hockey forwards